Bhutanese legislation is created by the bicameral Parliament of Bhutan. Either the upper house National Council, the lower house National Assembly, or the Attorney General may author bills to be passed as acts, with the exception of money and financial bills, which are the sole purview of the National Assembly. When a bill has been introduced and passed by one house, it must present the bill to the other house within thirty days from the date of passing, and the bill may be passed during the next session of Parliament. In the case of budget bills and urgent matters, a bill must be passed in the same session of Parliament.

Once bills have passed Parliament, they are submitted to the King for royal assent within fifteen days.

If the other house neither passes nor returns the bill by the end of the next session, the bill is deemed to have passed, and the house in which the bill originated shall present the bill within fifteen days to the King for assent.

If the King does not grant assent to the bill, he returns the bill with amendments or objections for Parliament to deliberate and vote on the bill in a joint sitting. After Parliament deliberates and passes the bill in a joint sitting, Parliament resubmits the bill to the Druk Gyalpo who must then grant assent to the bill.

Acts passed predating the enactment of the Constitution in 2008 were passed under different procedures, some originating as promulgations by the King as indicated in their preamble. Below is a list of Acts of the Kingdom of Bhutan.

List of Acts of the Kingdom of Bhutan

See also 
Parliament of Bhutan
National Council of Bhutan
National Assembly of Bhutan
Law of Bhutan
Constitution of Bhutan

Notes

References

External links
, a list of Bhutanese legislation on an alternate server